There have been several peerage titles of Baron Herbert or variations:

 Baron Herbert, hereditary peerage created in 1461
 Baron Herbert of Chirbury, hereditary peerage created several times
 Baron Herbert of Lea, hereditary peerage created in 1861
 Nick Herbert, Baron Herbert of South Downs (born 1963), Conservative politician